John Anthony (4 December 1932 – 16 June 2009) was a British sports shooter. He competed at the 1972 Summer Olympics and the 1976 Summer Olympics.

References

External links
 

1932 births
2009 deaths
British male sport shooters
Olympic shooters of Great Britain
Shooters at the 1972 Summer Olympics
Shooters at the 1976 Summer Olympics
People from Romford
Sportspeople from London
20th-century British people